MYO9B is a gene that encodes the Myosin-IXb protein.

References

Further reading

External links